Rhinella fissipes, the Carabaya toad, is a species of toad in the family Bufonidae that is found in Bolivia and Peru. Its natural habitats are subtropical or tropical moist montane forests, rivers, freshwater marshes, and intermittent freshwater marshes.

Status 
Rhinella fissipes is considered not threatened given its large and vast distribution. Habitat loss has effected the distribution of Rhinella fissipes, but has not been evaluated as a threat.

Conservation 
The Carabaya toad is found in a couple of National Parks to help further protection. Some of these parks include the Pilon Lajas Biosphere Reserve and Carrasco National Park.

References 

 
 

fissipes
Amphibians described in 1903
Amphibians of Bolivia
Amphibians of Peru
Taxonomy articles created by Polbot